New Hope is an unincorporated community in the southeast corner of Franklin Township, Owen County, in the U.S. state of Indiana. It lies near the intersection of County Road 740 South (a.k.a. Freedom-New Hope Road) and County Road 285 West (a.k.a. Pottersville-New Hope Road), which is a community about nine miles southwest of the city of Spencer, the county seat.  Its elevation is 522 feet (159 m), and it is located at  (39.1831004 -86.8277840).

History
The community took its name from the local New Hope Church.

Geography
 This community lies on the east bank of Raccoon Creek, just north of where Lick Creek flows into it.
 Burton Cemetery is about two miles northwest of this community, and it is located on County Road 415 West (a.k.a. Freedom-New Hope Road) just south of Badger Lane at  (39.1922668 -86.8386176).
 Camden Cemetery is about two miles southeast of this community, and it is located on County Road 240 West Road, on the west bank of Lick Creek at  (39.1692118 -86.8119501).
 Leach Cemetery is about two miles northwest of this community, and it is located on County Road 600 South (a.k.a. Freedom Road) at  (39.2053223 -86.8430623).
 Neely Cemetery is about one mile northwest of this community, and it is located on County Road 415 West (a.k.a. Freedom-New Hope Road) just south of Badger Lane at  (39.1925446 -86.8419510).
 Oliphant Cemetery is about one mile northeast of this community, and it is located on and County Road 285 West (a.k.a. Pottersville-New Hope Road) just south of County Road 600 South (a.k.a. Freedom Road) at  (39.2019891 -86.8213952).
 Pryor Cemetery is about one mile east of this community, and it is located on and County Road 775 South, near its intersection with County Road 240 West and south of Porter Ridge at  (39.1772672 -86.8111169).
 Waker Cemetery is about a half a mile east of this community, and it is located on and County Road 750 South (a.k.a. Porter Ridge Road), just south of its intersection with County Road 265 West at  (39.1794893 -86.8194504).

School districts
 Spencer-Owen Community Schools, including a high school.

Political districts
 State House District 46
 State Senate District 39

Entertainment
 This community is about two miles west of the Country Auto Parts, the business that was the center of the 2013 one-season reality TV-show, Porter Ridge.

References

External links
 Roadside Thoughts for New Hope, Indiana
 Porter Ridge Show

Unincorporated communities in Owen County, Indiana
Unincorporated communities in Indiana